The  is a tramcar type operated by Tokyo Metropolitan Bureau of Transportation (Toei) on the Toden Arakawa Line in Tokyo, Japan, since May 2016. The planned fleet of eight cars is to be built from former 7000 series cars, rebuilt with new bogies and electrical equipment.

Design
The 7700 series cars are rebuilt from former 7000 series cars, which themselves were rebuilt in 1977 from cars dating from the 1950s with new bodies on the original underframes. The 7700 series cars reuse the bodies and air-conditioning equipment of the 7000 series cars but with new bogies identical to those used on the 8900 series cars and VVVF control equipment. Interior LED lighting is used. The cost of building the 7700 series from the earlier 7000 series cars is approximately 130 million yen per car, compared to the cost of approximately 180 million yen for purchasing new 8900 series cars.

Liveries
The individual tramcars are finished in retro-style liveries as follows.

History
Toei announced details of the new 7700 series fleet in March 2016.

The first car, 7701 in green livery, entered service on 30 May 2016. The two green-liveried cars will be followed by three cars in blue livery and three cars in maroon livery, all entering service by the end of fiscal 2016.

Build history details
The individual build histories of the tramcars are as follows.

References

External links

 Toei news release 

Electric multiple units of Japan
Tokyo Metropolitan Bureau of Transportation
Train-related introductions in 2016

ja:東京都交通局7700形電車
600 V DC multiple units